Sant'Ambrogio Vescovo is a Baroque-style, Roman Catholic church located on Via Libertà #2 in the town of Gabbioneta-Binanuova in the province of Cremona, region of Lombardy, Italy.

History
The single nave structure was erected in the late 17th-century atop an earlier structure. The facade was not completed until 1710. It has two frescoes at the entrance by Eliodoro Coccoli: St Ambrosius enters Milan and the Immaculate Conception.

The interiors still retain the 17th-century altars, with marble bases and polychrome faux-marble, dedicated to the Madonna, the Sacred Heart, and containing altarpieces depicting Saint Antony of Padua and a Deposition with St Roch. The Organ was made by the Amati family in 1860. The church gained from the patronage of the Pallavicino family.

References

Churches in the province of Cremona
17th-century Roman Catholic church buildings in Italy
Baroque church buildings in Lombardy
Roman Catholic churches completed in 1710
1710 establishments in Italy